Corentin Tirard (born 18 October 1995) is a French professional footballer who plays as a midfielder for Championnat National 2 club Thonon Evian.

Club career
A youth product of Monaco, Tirard joined Grenoble in Championnat National on 20 July 2017. Tirard made his professional debut with Grenoble in a 2–1 Ligue 2 win over Nancy on 19 October 2018. In January 2019, he was loaned six month to  Sparta.

On 28 August 2019, Tirard joined Thonon Evian.

Honours 
Thonon Evian

 Championnat National 3: 2021–22
 Régional 1 Auvergne-Rhône-Alpes: 2019–20

Notes

References

External links
 
 
 
 
 GF38 Profile

1995 births
People from Romans-sur-Isère
Living people
French footballers
France youth international footballers
Olympique de Valence players
AS Monaco FC players
Grenoble Foot 38 players
A.E. Sparta P.A.E. players
Thonon Evian Grand Genève F.C. players
Ligue 2 players
Championnat National players
Championnat National 2 players
Championnat National 3 players
Régional 1 players
Association football midfielders
Sportspeople from Drôme
French expatriate footballers
Expatriate footballers in Greece
French expatriate sportspeople in Greece
Footballers from Auvergne-Rhône-Alpes